This is a list of people from Saint Lucia in the eastern Caribbean.

A
 Makeba Alcide (born 1990) – athlete, born in Castries
 Pamela Alfred (born 1978) – international cricketer
 Kenny Davis Anthony (born 1951) – Prime Minister of St Lucia, born in Laborie
 Joyce Auguste – musician and leader of The Hewanorra Voices
 Marie Grace Augustin (1897–1996) – businesswoman

B
 Michelle Baptiste (born 1977) – Olympic long jumper, born in St Lucia
 Danielle Beaubrun (born 1990) – Olympic swimmer, born in St Lucia
Kevin Bertin also known as Monét X Change (born 1990) – drag queen, RuPaul's Drag Race Season 10 contestant and RuPaul's Drag Race All Stars winner, born in St Lucia
 Chris Boucher (born 1993) – NBA basketball player, born in Castries
 Rufus George Bousquet (born 1958) – politician, cabinet minister, born in St Lucia
 Winston Branch (born 1947) – artist, living in California, born in Castries
 Desmond Brathwaite – politician and government minister

C
 Ignatius Cadette (born 1957) – international cricketer, born in Castries
 Neville Cenac – Foreign Minister of St Lucia, born in Soufriere
 Winston Francis Cenac (1925–2004) – Prime Minister of St Lucia, born in Soufriere
 George Frederick Lawrence Charles (1916–2004) – Chief Minister of St Lucia
 Johnson Charles (born 1989) – international cricketer, born in Castries
 Ryan Charles (born 1986) – St Lucian, British based boxer, mother born in St Lucia
 Allen Michael Chastanet – Prime Minister of Saint Lucia
 Sir Frederick Joseph Clarke (1912–1980) – St Lucia’s first native governor (1967–1973)
 Sir John George Melvin Compton (1925–2007) – Chief Minister of St Lucia, born St Vincent and the Grenadines but raised in St Lucia
 Petrus Compton – politician and government minister

D
Stephen Dantes (born 1982) – poet and novelist, born in Saltibus, Choiseul
Suzie Agnes-Ida d'Auvergne (1942–2014) – High Court judge
Nicole David – soca musician
 Sir Justin Louis Devaux (1884–1943) – lawyer and colonial Chief Justice

E
 Darvin Edwards (born 1986) – high jumper, St Lucian record holder, born in Castries
 Craig Walt Emmanuel (born 1986) – international cricketer, born in St Lucia
 Edmund Estephane (born 1968) – politician, cabinet minister
 Erma-Gene Evans (born 1984) – javelin thrower, born in Castries
 Nathalie Emmanuel (born 1989) – actress, born in England

F
 Verena Marcelle Felicien (born 1964) – women's Test cricketer, born in Castries
 Alvin La Feuille (born 1978) – international cricketer
 Felix Finisterre – politician
 Sir Vincent Floissac (1928–2010) – lawyer and judge, born in St Lucia
 Sarah Lucy Flood-Beaubrun (born 1969) – politician and government minister, born in Desruisseaux
 Emile Ford (born Michael Emile Telford Miller) (born 1937) – singer and musician (Emile Ford and the Checkmates), born in Castries, raised in the  Bahamas
 Claudius James Francis (born 1959) – politician
 Hunter J. Francois (1924–2014) – politician and government minister
 Walter Francois – politician
 Richard Frederick (born 1965) – lawyer, politician and government minister, born in Micoud

G
 Louis Bertrand George – politician and government minister

H
 Cornelius Cyprian Henry (born 1956) – international cricketer (for Canada), born in St Lucia
 Ronald "Boo" Hinkson – jazz guitarist, born in St Lucia
 Emma Hippolyte – OBE, politician
 Kendel Hippolyte – poet and playwright, born in St Lucia
 Julian Robert Hunte (born 1940) – politician, foreign minister, born in Castries

J
 Shervon Jack (born 1986) – professional footballer
 Arsene Vigil James (1944) – politician, born in Desruisseaux
 Earl Jude Jean (born 1971) – professional footballer, St Lucian international, born in St Lucia
 Ignatius Jean – politician
 Teddyson John – musician, born in Castries
 Velon Leo John – politician
 Sonia M. Johnny (born 1953) – permanent member of the Permanent Council of the Organization of American States, first woman ambassador to the United States
 Dominic Laurence Johnson – Olympic athlete, multiple St Lucian record holder
 Ezechiel Joseph – politician
 Guy Joseph – politician
 Zepherinus Joseph (born 1975) – middle and long distance runner, St Lucian multiple record holder, born in Mon Repos
 Peter Josie – former politician, born in Vieux Fort
 Didacus Jules (born c.1957) – educator

K
 Jane King (born 1952) – poet, born in Castries
 Stephenson King (born 1958) – Prime Minister of St Lucia, born in Castries

L
 Cyprian Lansiquot –  lawyer and politician
 Cecil Lay – politician
 Vernetta Lesforis (born 1975) – Olympic sprinter, born in St Lucia
 Alderman Rowe Nicholas Lesmond (born 1978) – international cricketer, born in St Lucia
 Allen Montgomery Lewis (1909–1993) – Governor-General of St Lucia, born in Castries
 Vaughan Allen Lewis (born 1940) – Prime Minister of St Lucia
 Sir William Arthur Lewis (1915–1991) – economist, Nobel Prize for Economics in 1979, born in Castries
 Sir Allan Fitzgerald Laurent Louisy (1916–2011) – Prime Minister of St Lucia, born in Labourie
 Dame Pearlette Louisy (born 1946) – Governor General of St Lucia, born in Laborie
 Vladimir Lucien (born 1988) – writer, critic and actor

M
 William George Mallet (1923–2010) – Deputy Prime Minister, Governor-General, born Panama and raised in St Lucia
 Gabriel Malzaire (born 1957) – clergyman, Bishop of Roseau, Dominica and Archbishop-elect of Castries, born in Mon Repos
 Joseph Marcell (born 1948) – actor (played the butler in Fresh Prince of Bel Air), born in St Lucia but moved to England at nine years of age
 Mario Michel (born 1960) – lawyer, high court judge and politician, government minister
 Monét X Change (born 1990) – drag queen and contestant on RuPaul's Drag Race
 Keith Mondesir (born 1948) – politician and government minister, born in Castries
 Peter Lenard Montoute (born 1962) – politician and government minister, born in Gros Islet

N
 Marcus Neill Nicholas – politician

O
 George Odlum (1934–2003) – Deputy Prime Minister of St Lucia, born in Castries

P
 Jamie Peterkin (born 1982) – Olympic swimmer, born in Castries
 Philip Joseph Pierre – Prime Minister of Saint Lucia
 Michael Pilgrim (born 1947) – Acting Prime Minister of St Lucia
 Alain Providence (born 1976 November 29) – football manager, ex St Lucia national football team manager
 Dalton Polius (born 1991 September 12) – first class cricketer

R 
 Menissa Rambally (born 1976) – politician and government minister
 Alvina Reynolds – politician and government Minister for Health, Wellness, Human Services and Gender Relations 
 Gale Tracy Christiane Rigobert – politician, born in Micoud
 Lennard Riviere – MP and Attorney-General, from Soufriere
 Ives Heraldine Rock (1933–2012) – politician and government minister

S
 Darren Julius Garvey Sammy (born 1983) – international test cricketer, born in Dugard, Micoud
 Jonel Scott (born 1992) – played in ESPN Rise High School National Basketball Game 2011 
 Sesenne or Dame Marie Selipha Descartes, DBE, BEM (1914–2010) – folk singer, born in Malgretoute, Micoud
 Anthony Bryan Severin (born 1955) – Ambassador to the United Nations
 Aimran Simmons – musician and pan player
 Joseph Solomon (died 1995) – executed murderer
 Levern Donaline Spencer (born 1984) – high jumper, born in Castries
 Clement Springer – musician and folklorist

T
 Isidore Philip Tisson (1985–2010) – international footballer, shot in New York

W
 Derek Alton Walcott (1930–2017) – poet and playwright, Nobel Prizewinner 1992, born in Castries
 Roderick Walcott (1930–2000) – dramatist, twin brother of Derek Alton Walcott, born in Castries
 Rick Wayne (born Learie Carasco) (born 1938) – bodybuilder, publisher and talk-show host, born in St Lucia
 Boswell Williams (1926–2014) – politician, Governor General, born in St Lucia
 David R. Williams – Harvard University public health sociologist
 Marius Wilson – politician
 Trix Worrell (born 1960) – writer and director, born in St Lucia

X
 Llewellyn Xavier, OBE (born 1945) – artist, born in St Lucia

Y
 Marland Yarde – rugby union player who has played for the English national side, born in St Lucia

References

Saint Lucia
People

Saint Lucia